The Vulcan's Thumb is a rock pinnacle in the Pacific Ranges of southwestern British Columbia, Canada. It is the largest of a number of slender pinnacles protruding from the sharp summit ridge of Pyroclastic Peak, which forms part of the Mount Cayley massif.

Three eruptive stages built the Mount Cayley massif, the second of which is named after the Vulcan's Thumb.

See also
 Cascade Volcanoes
 Garibaldi Volcanic Belt
 List of volcanoes in Canada
 Volcanism of Canada
 Volcanism of Western Canada

References

Volcanoes of British Columbia
Two-thousanders of British Columbia
Garibaldi Volcanic Belt
New Westminster Land District